I'm Taraneh, 15 is a 2002 Iranian film directed by Rasul Sadrameli. The film was selected as the Iranian entry for the Best Foreign Language Film at the 75th Academy Awards, but it did not make the final shortlist.

Plot
Fifteen-year-old Taraneh, whose widowed father is in jail, refuses the unwanted attentions of carpet salesman Amir - until Amir's mother, at the insistence of his son, talks Taraneh into accepting Amir's marriage proposal. However, instead of a typical marriage, the union is in form of a temporary religious ceremony or "sigheh." Within four months the couple realize that they are incompatible, they divorce and Amir returns to Germany. When Taraneh discovers that she is pregnant she decides against all advice and intense social pressure, to keep the baby.

Cast
 Taraneh Alidoosti as Taraneh
 Hossein Mahjoub as Father
 Mahtab Nasirpour as Mrs. Kishmili
 Milad Sadrameli as Amir

Awards and nominations

See also
 List of submissions to the 75th Academy Awards for Best Foreign Language Film

References

External links
 
 
 

2002 films
Iranian drama films
Persian-language films
Films whose director won the Best Directing Crystal Simorgh
Films whose writer won the Best Screenplay Crystal Simorgh